The American Scenic and Historic Preservation Society was created in 1895 as New York’s first organized preservation lobby. The Society operated as a national organization to protect the natural scenery and the preservation of historic landmarks; to preserve landmarks and records of the past or present; to erect memorials and promote appreciation of the scenic beauty of America.

There is no information about when the Society dissolved but there are no records of their activities after 1979.

Projects
The Society's primary purpose was to protect historic and/or scenic sites. In many cases, it acted as custodian for these properties, purchasing them, providing maintenance, and keeping them open to the public. Examples include:
 Battle Island Park
 Fort Brewerton
 Hamilton Grange
 John Boyd Thacher Park
 John William Draper Memorial Park, Hastings-on-Hudson
 Letchworth Park
 Philipse Manor Hall
 Stony Point Battlefield Reservation
 Watkins Glen

Awards
The Society had responsibility for selecting the recipients of a number of Awards, the most prestigious being the Pugsley Medal, created by Cornelius Amory Pugsley in 1928. The award honors champions of parks and conservation. After the dissolution of the Society, the Pugsley Medal was awarded by the National Park Foundation. In recent years, the Award has been presented by the American Academy for Park and Recreation Administration.

Officers

 1895–1904 Andrew Haswell Green
 1905–1906 Walter Seth Logan
 1907–1926 George Frederick Kunz
 1934–1940 LeRoy Elwood Kimball
 1941   Alexander Hamilton
 1942–1950 George McAneny
 1951–1965 Alexander Hamilton

References

1895 establishments in New York City
1979 disestablishments in New York (state)
Organizations established in 1895
Organizations disestablished in 1979
Historic preservation organizations in the United States
Conservation and restoration organizations
Historical societies in New York City